Naomi Rankin (born c. 1953) is a Canadian politician and the leader of the Communist Party – Alberta since 1992. She is the longest-serving political party leader in the province, and has run as a perennial candidate in every federal and provincial election in Alberta since 1982.

Political career 
Rankin became leader of the Communist Party in Alberta in 1992, after the collapse of the Soviet Union sent the party into crisis. Since 1982, she has run in every provincial and federal election for the Communist Party – Alberta and the Communist Party of Canada respectively. Rankin herself usually fields around 100 votes.

In a typical election campaign, Rankin goes door-to-door and distributes pamphlets, as she tries to engage voters in discussions about the party's main platforms. In the 1980s, these included the nationalization of transnational oil and gas companies, and making Alberta a nuclear weapons-free zone. Since then, issues on the Communist Party agenda have included opposing privatization, doubling the corporate tax rate, and making drastic cuts to military spending. She also appears in forums, debates, and media interviews, in which she tries to debunk popular myths about the Communist Party and socialism. As a candidate, Rankin has aimed to spread her message beyond the party's traditional targets such as trade unions, environmental groups, women's organizations, and farmers.

Personal life 
Rankin is widowed with two children, and is retired from her career as a computer programmer. She has lived in Edmonton since 1963. A social activist since her teens, she has been active in peace and women's organizations. Rankin sings in the "Notre Dame des Bananes” choir, which performs songs about social justice, and has also sung as a tenor with the Richard Eaton Singers.

Electoral record

Federal 

Note: Canadian Alliance vote is compared to the Reform vote in 1997.

Provincial

|}

References

External links 
 Communist Party of Alberta homepage

Communist Party – Alberta candidates in Alberta provincial elections
1952 births
Living people
Communist Party of Canada candidates in the 1984 Canadian federal election
Communist Party of Canada candidates in the 1988 Canadian federal election
Independent candidates in the 1993 Canadian federal election
Independent candidates in the 1997 Canadian federal election
Communist Party of Canada candidates in the 2000 Canadian federal election
Communist Party of Canada candidates in the 2004 Canadian federal election
Communist Party of Canada candidates in the 2006 Canadian federal election
Female Canadian political party leaders
Canadian women in federal politics
Women in Alberta politics
21st-century Canadian women politicians
20th-century Canadian women politicians